Disorder may refer to randomness, non-order, or no intelligible pattern.

Disorder may also refer to:

Healthcare
 Disorder (medicine), a functional abnormality or disturbance
 Mental disorder or psychological disorder, a psychological pattern associated with distress or disability that occurs in an individual and is not a part of normal development or culture:
 Anxiety disorder, different forms of abnormal and pathological fear and anxiety
 Conversion disorder, neurological symptoms such as numbness, blindness, paralysis, or fits, where no neurological explanation is possible
 Obsessive–compulsive disorder, an anxiety disorder characterized by repetitive behaviors aimed at reducing anxiety
 Obsessive–compulsive personality disorder, obsession with perfection, rules, and organization
 Personality disorder, an enduring pattern of inner experience and behavior that deviates markedly from the expectations of the culture of the individual who exhibits it

Law enforcement
 Civil disorder, one or more forms of disturbance caused by a group of people
 Lawlessness, a lack of laws or law enforcement

Science
 Crystallographic disorder, disordered atom locations in crystals
 Order and disorder

Arts, entertainment, and media

Films
 Disorder (1962 film), a film by Franco Brusati
 Disorder (2009 film), a Chinese documentary 
 Disorder (2015 film), a French film

Music
 Disorder (band), a Bristol-based hardcore punk band
 Disorder (album), an album by The Gazette
 Disorder (EP), an EP by Front Line Assembly
 "Disorder", a song by Joy Division from the 1979 album Unknown Pleasures

Other uses
 Dis-order, the mail order service of Displeased Records

See also
 Chaos
 Order